Projecto: 2501 is a joint concept EP by Souls of Mischief and Hieroglyphics MC Tajai and SupremeEx. The album draws upon ideas from Serial Experiments Lain and Ghost in the Shell, as well as the artists' own ideas about technology and its influence on life (see their cover story feature & interview in the December 2000 issue of XLR8R magazine). It was released on vinyl in November 2000, and later as an enhanced CD in April 2001.

The EP was recorded and arranged remotely over the Internet, with Tajai and SupremeEx exchanging files and communicating with each other from their respective coasts.

Several other artists such as Shing02, DJ Low Budget (Hollertronix), Jay Biz (ex Hieroglyphics), DJ Nozawa and Major Terror are featured.

Two random trading cards (out of a total set of 4) are included with every CD and vinyl record. Additional enhanced, hidden content on the CD includes a bonus MP3, computer wallpapers and videos in the studio recording Projecto: 2501.

The duo would team-up once again in 2005 to release their first full-length album together, Nuntype.

Track listing
Authentic Intelligence
Origin of Fable
Contact (featuring Shing02, Major Terror and DJ Nozawa)
Digidestruction (featuring DJ Low Budget)
Conceptualize (featuring Jay Biz)
Fluid Motion

External links 
 Projecto: 2501 Website
 SupremeEx Website
 Souls of Mischief Website
 "Fusing Music With New Visual Media" cover story & interview, XLR8R magazine,  December 2000
 Interview with Yameen (SupremeEx) & Tajai about the science of Projecto: 2501

Tajai albums
2000 EPs
Hieroglyphics Imperium Recordings EPs